Assin Kyekyewere is a small town and is the district capital of Assin South district in the Central Region of Ghana. Due to its proximity to Assin Nsuaem, it is often mistaken to be part of the same town.

References

Populated places in the Central Region (Ghana)